John L. Ryals (March 27, 1933 - July 19, 2017) was an American politician and attorney in the state of Florida.

Ryals was born in Plant City, Florida. He worked in the advertising and public relations industry, and is also a citrus farmer. He served in the Florida House of Representatives from 1966 to 1980, representing district 63. He is a member of the Democratic Party.

References

2017 deaths
1933 births
Democratic Party members of the Florida House of Representatives
People from Plant City, Florida
People from Brandon, Florida